Moses of Évreux was a French tosafist,one of three brothers Rabbis, and author of a siddur, who flourished at Évreux in Normandy in the first half of the thirteenth century. His father was Shneur of Évreux who left behind three children each of them outstanding scholars: Moses of Évreux, Samuel of Évreux and Isaac of Évreux. Moses was the oldest brother and teacher of his younger brothers. They were collectively called "the sages of Évreux".

Gross identifies him with Moses ben Shneor, the teacher of the author of Sefer ha-Gan, a commentary on the Pentateuch. Others have generally supposed to him to be the son of Yom-Ṭov, referred to in Elijah Mizraḥi's responsa (No. 82).

The Tosafot of Évreux, much used by tosafists, was his work. He is quoted in the tosafot on Berakot, and his name is frequently written. His tosafot are called also Shiṭṭah of Évreux. Moses wrote his tosafot on the margin of a copy of Isaac Alfasi, whose authority he invoked.

References

 Its bibliography:
 Michael, Or ha-Ḥayyim, No. 1118;
 Zunz, Z. G. p. 39;
 Carmoly, Ben Chananja 1861, p. 195;
 Gross, Gallia Judaica, p. 40;
 Steinschneider, Cat. Bodl. col. 1814.

French Tosafists
13th-century  French rabbis

he:תוספות איוורא#רבי משה בן רבי שניאור